Dąbie was a district of the city of Szczecin, Poland, that functioned from 1954 to 1976.

History 
Dąbie was established on 7 October 1954, as one of four district of the city of Szczecin, Poland. The other three districts were: Nad Odrą, Pogodno, and Śródmieście. It bordered Nad Odrą to the northwest, and Śródmieście to the southwest. In 1961, it was inhabited by 28 146 people. It existed until 19 November 1976, when the district were abolished.

The city was again divided into districts in 1990. Within the former area of the district was established Prawobrzeże.

Subdivisions 
The district was subdivided into 9 administrative neighbourhoods.

References 

Dabie
Dabie
Dabie
Dabie
Dabie